Amauroderma sessile is a polypore fungus in the family Ganodermataceae. It was described as a new species in 2015 by mycologists Allyne Christina Gomes-Silva, Leif Ryvarden, and Tatiana Gibertoni. The specific epithet sessile (from the Latin word sessilis = without a stipe) refers to the characteristic stipe-free fruit body. A. sessile is found in the states of Amazonas, Mato Grosso, and Pará in the Brazilian Amazon.

References

sessile
Fungi described in 2015
Fungi of Brazil
Taxa named by Leif Ryvarden